Asteroid City is an upcoming American romantic comedy-drama film directed and co-produced by Wes Anderson, from a screenplay he wrote with Roman Coppola. The film follows the transformative events that occur at an annual Junior Stargazer convention in 1955. It features an ensemble cast that has been described as being "larger than most other Anderson films that are ensemble in nature." 

Asteroid City set to be released by Focus Features in the United States in limited release on June 16, 2023, with a wider release on June 23, 2023.

Premise
In 1955, students and parents from across the country gather for scholarly competition, rest, recreation, comedy, drama, and romance at a Junior Stargazer convention held in a fictional American desert town.

Cast

Production
In September 2020, it was revealed Wes Anderson would be writing and directing a romance film, which he would produce alongside Jeremy Dawson and Steven Rales for American Empirical Pictures and Indian Paintbrush. By February 2021, Michael Cera and Jeff Goldblum entered negotiations to star in the director's next film, which was now described as being about a "group of brainy teenagers." Tilda Swinton was the first person to officially join the cast, doing so in June 2021.

Principal photography, originally set for Rome, took place in Spain between August and October 2021. Several sets in Chinchón, Madrid, resembling a desert landscape and a mock train station, were used for the shoot. Cast member Fisher Stevens said the film would include "the wildest cast since The Bridge on the River Kwai" and that the cast and crew "were all bubbled together in a hotel, which was an old monastery."

The film's title was revealed by Bill Murray to be Asteroid City at the BFI London Film Festival in October 2021. Alexandre Desplat composed the film's score in his sixth collaboration with Anderson. In July 2022, it was announced that Focus Features would distribute the film, reuniting them with Anderson after Moonrise Kingdom (2012). It was also revealed Murray would not be in the film as initially reported as a result of contracting COVID-19 before he could shoot his scenes.

Costume design was by multiple Oscar-laureate Milena Canonero.

Release
Asteroid City is scheduled for a limited release in the United States on June 16, 2023, before expanding to a wide release on June 23, 2023.

MPA rating

For the United States release, an initial cut of the film received an R rating from the Motion Picture Association (MPA) for "Brief Graphic Nudity". Focus Features is currently trying to appeal the rating.

References

External links
 

Upcoming films
American romantic comedy-drama films
Films directed by Wes Anderson
Films produced by Wes Anderson
Films scored by Alexandre Desplat
Films set in 1955
Films set in Arizona
Films shot in Chinchón
Films with screenplays by Wes Anderson
Focus Features films
Indian Paintbrush (production company) films
Upcoming English-language films